Portrait of a Man (in Slovak: Portrét muža) or Self-portrait (in Slovak: Autoportrét) is believed to be a self-portrait of Slovak painter Jan Kupecký created in the period 1700 to 1709. The picture is painted in oil on canvas with dimensions of 68.2 x 56 cm and is part of the collection of the Slovak National Gallery in Bratislava, Slovakia.

Kupiecký was one of the leading representatives of the Central European Baroque period and particularly known for his portraits. This work is unusual in that it highlights the facial features of the subject against an otherwise dark featureless background.  Based on comparisons with his other subsequent works it was later signed and dated, somewhat indistinctly, as being by Kupecký in 1709 and considered for many years to be the only genuine work by Kupecký in the Slovak collection. It would have been created during the artist's time in Italy and  the only known example of his work from that time.

However in a monograph by Eduard A. Safarik,  a noted Italian art historian of Czech descent, it is suggested that the painting is actually a self-portrait by the younger artist Franz Anton Palko.

References 

Self-portraits
Slovak art
1700s paintings